Boké Region is located in western  Guinea. It is bordered by the countries of Senegal and Guinea-Bissau and the Guinean regions of Kindia and Labé.  Its capital is the city of Boké.

Administrative divisions
Boké Region is divided into five prefectures; which are further sub-divided into 37 sub-prefectures:

 Boffa Prefecture (8 sub-prefectures)
 Boké Prefecture (10 sub-prefectures)
 Fria Prefecture (4 sub-prefectures)
 Gaoual Prefecture (8 sub-prefectures)
 Koundara Prefecture (7 sub-prefectures)

Mining reserves
Boké Region is the home to a great part of Guinea's aluminium (or bauxite) reserves.  At least two of the country's largest mining facilities are located there:

Compagnie des Bauxites de Guinée, or CBG, which is operated by Halco Mining, an international and intercorporate aluminium mining entity.
 Alumina Company of Guinea, or ACG,  operating the Friguia bauxite-alumina complex in Fria Prefecture.

See also
Aluminium in Africa

References

 

Regions of Guinea